Subtilisin is a protease (a protein-digesting enzyme) initially obtained from Bacillus subtilis.

Subtilisins belong to subtilases, a group of serine proteases that – like all serine proteases – initiate the nucleophilic attack on the peptide (amide) bond through a serine residue at the active site. Subtilisins typically have molecular weights 27kDa.  They can be obtained from certain types of soil bacteria, for example, Bacillus amyloliquefaciens from which they are secreted in large amounts.

Nomenclature 
Subtilisin is also commercially known as  Alcalase®, Endocut-02L, ALK-enzyme, bacillopeptidase, Bacillus subtilis alkaline proteinase bioprase, bioprase AL, colistinase, genenase I, Esperase®, maxatase, protease XXVII, thermoase, superase, subtilisin DY, subtilopeptidase, SP 266, Savinase®, Savinase® Evity, kazusase, protease VIII, protin A 3L, orientase 10B, protease S, Progress® Uno, Liquanase® Evity®, Progress® Excel . It is the type serine endopeptidase of MEROPS family S8.

Structure 

The structure of subtilisin has been determined by X-ray crystallography. The mature form is a 275-residue globular protein with several alpha-helices, and a large beta-sheet. The N-terminal contains an I9 propeptide domain that assists the folding of subtilisin. Proteolytic removal of the domain activates the enzyme. It is structurally unrelated to the chymotrypsin-clan of serine proteases, but uses the same type of catalytic triad in the active site. This makes it a classic example of convergent evolution.

Mechanism of catalysis 

The active site features a charge-relay network involving Asp-32, His-64, and active site Ser-221 arranged in a catalytic triad. The charge-relay network functions as follows: The carboxylate side-chain of Asp-32 hydrogen-bonds to a nitrogen-bonded proton on His-64's imidazole ring. This is possible because Asp is negatively charged at physiological pH. The other nitrogen on His-64 hydrogen-bonds to the O-H proton of Ser-221. This last interaction results in charge-separation of O-H, with the oxygen atom being more nucleophilic. This allows the oxygen atom of Ser-221 to attack incoming substrates (i.e., peptide bonds), assisted by a neighboring carboxyamide side-chain of Asn-155.

Even though Asp-32, His-64, and Ser-221 are sequentially far apart, they converge in the 3D structure to form the active site.

To summarize the interactions described above, Ser-221 acts as a nucleophile and cleaves peptide bonds with its partially negative oxygen atom. This is possible due to the nature of the charge-relay site of subtilisin.

Applications

Research tool 

In molecular biology using B. subtilis as a model organism, the gene encoding subtilisin (aprE) is often the second gene of choice after amyE for integrating reporter constructs into, due to its dispensability.

Commercial 

Protein-engineered subtilisins are widely used in commercial products (the native enzyme is easily inactivated by detergents and high temperatures) and is also called a stain cutter, for example, in laundry and dishwashing detergents, cosmetics, food processing, skin care products, contact lens cleaners, and for research in synthetic organic chemistry.

Occupational safety and health 
People can be exposed to subtilisin in the workplace by breathing it in, swallowing it, skin contact, and eye contact. The National Institute for Occupational Safety and Health (NIOSH) has set a recommended exposure limit (REL) of 60 ng/m3 over a 60-minute period.

Subtilisin can cause "enzymatic detergent asthma". People who are sensitive to Subtilisin (Alcalase) usually are also allergic to the bacteria Bacillus subtilis.

References 

EC 3.4.21